The 1909 Hong Kong Sanitary Board election was held on 20 January 1909 was an election for the two unofficial seats in the Sanitary Board of Hong Kong. It was the first election with more than two contestants since the 1903 election.

An Amendment of the Public Health and Buildings Ordinance passed in 1908 by the Legislative Council slightly extended the electorate, reorganised the powers of the Board and officially defined the jurisdictions of the Board were Hong Kong Island, Kowloon and New Kowloon.

It was the first election with more than two contestants since 1903. Four candidates ran in the election and among them Augustus Shelton Hooper and G. H. L. Fitzwilliams were elected.

Result

Citations

References
 Endacott, G. B. Government and people in Hong Kong, 1841-1962 : a constitutional history Hong Kong University Press. (1964) 
 The Hong Kong Government Gazette
 Twentieth century impressions of Hong Kong, Shanghai, and other Treaty Ports of China. Their history, people, commerce, industries, and resources; editor in chief: Arnold Wright, assistant editor: H.A. Cartwright. Published 1908 by Lloyd's Greater Britain Pub. Co. in London.

Hong Kong
1909 in Hong Kong
Sanitary
January 1909 events
1909 elections in the British Empire